La Primavera Airport  is an airport serving the town of La Primavera, in the Vichada Department of Colombia.

See also

Transport in Colombia
List of airports in Colombia

References

External links
OpenStreetMap - La Primavera
OurAirports - La Primavera
FallingRain - La Primavera

Airports in Colombia